Scardinius hesperidicus is a species of ray-finned fish in the family Cyprinidae.
It is native to Po and Adriatic drainages east of the Po in Italy, San Marino, and Switzerland, and has been introduced into other area watersheds, especially in Italy. Its natural habitats are rivers and freshwater lakes.

References

Scardinius
Fish described in 1845
Taxa named by Charles Lucien Bonaparte